Yvonne Cernota (19 September 1979 in Halberstadt, East Germany – 12 March 2004) was a German bobsledder who competed from 2000 to 2004 at the position of the brakeswomen. She won a bronze medal in the two-woman event at the 2003 FIBT World Championships in Winterberg.

Cernota was killed in a training accident at the bobsleigh, luge, and skeleton track in Königssee. Two weeks before, she had finished fourth with fellow German bobsledder Cathleen Martini at the World Championships on the same track. It was the first bobsleigh fatality since 1990 and the 42nd overall since being included in the Winter Olympic program in 1924.

At the time of her death, Cernota was a student majoring in biochemistry.

References

Stern.de story on Cernota's death 

1979 births
2004 deaths
People from Halberstadt
People from Bezirk Magdeburg
German female bobsledders
Sportspeople from Saxony-Anhalt
Bobsledders who died while racing
Sport deaths in Germany
20th-century German women